Guild Education is a private company headquartered in Denver, Colorado that is employed by Fortune 1000 companies to manage their education assistance benefits. Guild works for corporate employer clients to facilitate direct payment for courses to education provider clients and offers marketing services to the education provider clients.

Corporate clients
Guild Education clients include major corporations and Fortune 500 companies, including Dollywood Parks and Resorts, Macy's, Inc., Sunrun, Target Corporation, and Walmart.

Education provider clients
Education provider clients include colleges and universities, including: North Carolina A&T, Pathstream, and Paul Quinn College.

In 2021, 2U made its degree programs, courses, and bootcamp programs available to the corporations that employ Guild. Google also made Google Career Certificates available to corporations that employ Guild.

Business strategy
Guild Education works for large corporations and contracts with adult education providers. It offers marketing services and schools pay only when students enroll. The employers also get a tax break. In June 2021, CNBC reported Guild Education also seeks to profit from its expectation of increasing displacement of workers due to automation. In 2018, The Century Foundation contributor Kelia Washington wrote "at best, these programs are limited in their ability to meaningfully increase college access and completion, and, at worst, they can create additional barriers for employees seeking to obtain high-quality, meaningful credentials."

Shareholders
In 2021 Lumina Foundation became a shareholder in Guild Education.

See also
 For-profit higher education in the United States
 Online education
 Student loans

References

Companies based in Denver
 Higher education in the United States